Shivers in Summer is a 1963 Italian comedy film directed by Luigi Zampa and starring among others Vittorio Gassman.

Cast
 Vittorio Gassman - Captain Nardoni
 Sandra Milo - Yvonne
 Michèle Mercier - Gigi
 Philippe Leroy - Manolo
 Gabriella Giorgelli - Foschina
 Graziella Galvani - Selena
 Vittorio Congia - the Spanish cyclist
 Livio Lorenzon - Luigi
 Giampiero Littera - Franco
 Umberto D'Orsi - The attorney
 Mario Scaccia - Ugo
 Renzo Palmer - Sandro
 Enzo Garinei - Peppe
 Franco Abbina - Pippo
 Corrado Olmi - Antonio

External links

1963 films
1963 comedy films
Italian comedy films
1960s Italian-language films
Italian black-and-white films
Films directed by Luigi Zampa
Films set in Tuscany
Films shot in Tuscany
1960s Italian films